Meet Me at the Fair is a 1953 American musical film directed by Douglas Sirk and starring Dan Dailey, Diana Lynn and Hugh O'Brian. Produced and distributed by Universal Pictures, it was shot in technicolor.

Synopsis
A boy named Tad flees from the orphanage and is given a ride by Doc Tilbee, a man with a traveling medicine show. Meanwhile, Zerelda King is assigned to look into possible illegal and unethical activity at an orphanage, which may or may not involve her fiancé.

Cast
 Dan Dailey as Doc
 Diana Lynn as Zerelda
 Hugh O'Brian as Chilton
 Carole Mathews as Clara Brink
 Scatman Crothers as Enoch
 Chet Allen as Tad
 Rhys Williams as 	Pete McCoy
 Thomas E. Jackson as 	Billy Gray
 Russell Simpson as 	Sheriff Evans
 George Chandler as 	Deputy Leach
 Virginia Brissac as 	Mrs. Spooner
 John Maxwell as	Mr. Spooner
 Doris Packer as Mrs. Swaile
 Edna Holland as 	Miss Burghey
 George Spaulding as Governor
 Franklyn Farnum as Wall Street Tycoon 
 Roger Moore as Wall Street Tycoon 
 Max Wagner as 	Iceman

Reviews
Movie critic Leonard Maltin considers this to be a "pleasant musical".

References

External links

1953 films
Films directed by Douglas Sirk
Films set in 1904
Films set in St. Louis
Louisiana Purchase Exposition
1950s historical musical films
American historical musical films
Universal Pictures films
1950s English-language films
1950s American films